Ion Creangă (born December 11, 1962 in Goteşti) is a Moldovan jurist and the head of the Legal Department of the Parliament of Moldova.

Creangă was born in Goteşti, Cantemir District. He studied at the Moldova State University (1987–1992) and got his PhD in 2000. He is the head of the Legal Department of the Apparatus of the Parliament of Moldova. Also, he is secretary of the Commission for constitutional reform in Moldova.

External links 
 Directia juridica
 Constitutional Court OKs electoral law change

Notes

1962 births
Moldovan jurists
Moldova State University alumni
Living people